The settlement of Las Vegas, Nevada was founded in 1905 after the opening of a railroad that linked Los Angeles and Salt Lake City. The stopover attracted some farmers (mostly from Utah) to the area, and fresh water was piped in to the settlement. In 1911, the town was incorporated as part of the newly founded Clark County. Urbanization took off in 1931 when work started on the Boulder Dam (now the Hoover Dam), bringing a huge influx of young male workers, for whom theaters and casinos were built, largely by the Mafia. Electricity from the dam also enabled the building of many new hotels along the Strip. The arrival of Howard Hughes in 1966 did much to offset mob influence and helped turn Las Vegas into more of a family tourist center, now classified as a Mega resort.

The name Las Vegas was given to the city in 1829 by Rafael Rivera, a member of the Spanish explorer Antonio Armijo trading party that was traveling to Los Angeles, and stopped for water there on the Old Spanish Trail from New Mexico. At that time, several parts of the valley contained artesian wells surrounded by extensive green areas; Las Vegas means "the meadows" in Spanish. The flows from the wells fed the Las Vegas Wash, which runs to the Colorado River.

Prehistory
The prehistoric landscape of the Las Vegas Valley and most of Southern Nevada was once a marsh with water and vegetation. The rivers that created the marsh eventually went underground, and the marsh receded. The valley then evolved into a parched, arid landscape that only supported the hardiest animals and plants.

At some point in the valley's early geologic history, the water resurfaced and flowed into what is now the Colorado River. This created a luxurious plant life, forming a wetland oasis in the Mojave Desert landscape.

Evidence of prehistoric life in Las Vegas Valley has been found at the Tule Springs Fossil Beds National Monument. An abundance of Late Pleistocene fossils have been discovered from this locality, including Columbian mammoths and Camelops hesternus.

Native American (Paiute) history

Native Americans lived in the Las Vegas Valley, beginning over 10,000 years ago. Archaeologists have discovered baskets, petroglyphs, pictographs and other evidence in diverse locations, including Gypsum Cave and Tule Springs. Paiutes moved into the area as early as AD 700, migrating between nearby mountains in the summer and spending winter in the valley, near Big Springs.

1829–1905: Origins
A trade caravan of 60 men led by the Spanish merchant Antonio Armijo was charged with establishing a trade route to Los Angeles. By following the Pike and Smith routes through a tributary of Colorado River they came upon the Las Vegas Valley, described by Smith as the best point to re-supply before going onto California. The travelers named the area Las Vegas, which is Spanish for the meadows, or 'Fertile Plains'.

John C. Frémont traveled into the Las Vegas Valley on May 3, 1844 while it was still part of Mexico. He was appointed by President John Tyler to lead a group of scientists, scouts, and spies for the United States Army Corps of Engineers, which was preparing for a possible war with Mexico. Upon arriving in the valley they made camp at the Las Vegas Springs, establishing a clandestine fort there. A war with Mexico did occur, resulting in the region becoming United States territory. The fort was used in later years by travelers, mountain men, hunters, and traders seeking shelter, but never permanently was inhabited.

In 1855, William Bringhurst led a group of 29 Mormon missionaries from Utah to the Las Vegas Valley. The missionaries built a  adobe fort near a creek and used flood irrigation to water their crops. However, because of tensions rising among leaders of the small Mormon community, the summer heat and difficulty growing crops, the missionaries returned to Utah in 1857, abandoning the fort. (The remains of the fort are preserved in the Old Las Vegas Mormon Fort State Historic Park.)

For the next few years, the area remained unoccupied by Americans except for travelers and traders. Then the U.S. Army, in an attempt to deceive Confederate spies active in southern California in 1864, falsely publicized that it reclaimed the fort and had renamed it Fort Baker, briefly recalling the area to national attention. After the end of the war in 1865, Octavius Gass, with a commission from the federal government, re-occupied the fort. The Paiute nation had declined in numbers and negotiated a new treaty with the United States, ceding the area around the fort to the United States in return for relocation and supplies of food and farming equipment. Consequently, Gass started irrigating the old fields and renamed the area Las Vegas Rancho. Gass made wine at his ranch, and Las Vegas became known as the best stop on the Old Spanish Trail. In 1881, because of mismanagement and intrigue with a Mormon syndicate, Gass lost his ranch to Archibald Stewart to pay off a lien Stewart had on the property. In 1884, Archibald's wife Helen J. Stewart became the Las Vegas postmaster.

The property (increased to ), stayed with the family (despite Archibald Stewart's murder in July 1884) until it was purchased in 1902 by the San Pedro, Los Angeles, and Salt Lake Railroad, then being built across southern Nevada. The railroad was a project of Montana Senator William Andrews Clark. Clark enlisted Utah's U.S. Senator and mining magnate Thomas Kearns to ensure the line's completion through Utah to Las Vegas. The State Land Act of 1885 offered land at $1.25 per acre ($3.09/hectare). Clark and Kearns promoted the area to American farmers who quickly expanded the farming plots of the areas. Not until 1895 did the first large-scale migration of Mormons begin in the area, at long last fulfilling Brigham Young's early dream. Through wells and arid irrigation, agriculture became the primary industry for the next 20 years and in return for his development, the farmers named the area Clark County in honor of the railroad tycoon and Senator.

1905–1929: Birth, growth and crisis

By the early 20th century, wells piped water into the town, providing both a reliable source of fresh water and the means for additional growth. The increased availability of water in the area allowed Las Vegas to become a water stop, first for wagon trains and later railroads, on the trail between Los Angeles and points east such as Albuquerque, New Mexico.

The San Pedro, Los Angeles & Salt Lake Railroad was completed in 1905, linking Salt Lake City to southern California. U.S. Senator William Andrews Clark was the majority owner of the railroad, which was a corporation based in Utah. Among its original incorporators were Utah's U.S. Senator Thomas Kearns and his business partner David Keith. Kearns, one of the richer and more powerful men in Utah, and Keith were the owners of Utah's Silver King Coalition Mine, several mines in Nevada and The Salt Lake Tribune. Kearns and Keith helped Clark ensure the success of the new railroad across Utah and into Nevada to California. Curiously, for a time there were two towns named Las Vegas. The east-side of Las Vegas (which encompassed the modern Main Street and Las Vegas Boulevard) was owned by Clark, and the west-side of Las Vegas (which encompassed the area north of modern-day Bonanza Road) was owned by J.T. McWilliams, who was hired by the Stewart family during the sale of the Las Vegas Rancho and bought available land west of the ranch. It was from their property that Las Vegas took form.

Clark built another railroad branching off from Las Vegas to the boom town of Bullfrog called the Las Vegas and Tonopah Railroad. With the revenue coming down both railways that intersected there, the area of Las Vegas was quickly growing. On May 15, 1905, Las Vegas officially was founded as a city when , in what later became downtown, were auctioned to ready buyers. Las Vegas was the driving force in the creation of Clark County, Nevada in 1909, and the city was incorporated in 1911 as a part of the county. The first mayor of Las Vegas was Peter Buol, who served from 1911 to 1913.

Shortly after the city's incorporation, the State of Nevada reluctantly became the last western state to outlaw gambling. This occurred at midnight, October 1, 1910, when a strict anti-gambling law became effective in Nevada. It even forbade the western custom of flipping a coin for the price of a drink. Nonetheless, Las Vegas had a diversified economy and a stable and prosperous business community, and therefore continued to grow until 1917. In that year, a combination of economic influences and the redirection of resources by the federal government in support of the war effort forced the Las Vegas and Tonopah Railroad to declare bankruptcy. Although William Clark sold the remains of the company to the Union Pacific Railroad, a nationwide strike in 1922 left Las Vegas in a desperate state.

1930–1941: Hoover Dam and the first casinos

On July 3, 1930, President Herbert Hoover signed the appropriation bill for the Boulder Dam. The dam was renamed the Hoover Dam during the Truman administration. Work started on the dam in 1931 and Las Vegas' population swelled from around 5,000 citizens to 25,000, with most of the newcomers looking for a job building the dam. However, the demographic of the work force consisting of males from across the country with no attachment to the area created a market for large-scale entertainment. A combination of local Las Vegas business owners and Mafia crime lords helped develop the casinos and showgirl theaters to entertain the largely male dam construction workers.

Despite the influx of known crime figures, the local business community tried to cast Las Vegas in a respectable light when the Secretary of the Interior Ray Lyman Wilbur visited in 1929 to inspect the dam site. However a worker was found with alcohol on his breath (this was during the time of Prohibition) after a visit to Block 16 in Las Vegas. The government ultimately decided that a federally controlled town, Boulder City, would be erected for the dam workers.

Realizing that gambling would be profitable for local business, the Nevada state legislature legalized gambling at the local level in 1931. Las Vegas, with a small but already well-established illegal gambling industry, was poised to begin its rise as the gaming capital of the world. The county issued the first gambling license in 1931 to the Northern Club, and soon other casinos were licensed on Fremont Street, such as the Las Vegas Club and the Hotel Apache. Fremont Street became the first paved street in Las Vegas and received the city's first traffic light in 1931.

In reply, the federal government restricted movement of the dam workers to Las Vegas. Smuggling and circuitous routes then were developed. In 1934, to curtail these activities and the resulting growth of criminal figures in the gambling industry, the city's leading figures purged gambling dens and started an effort to stem the flow of workers from the dam. This only emboldened some dam workers who still contrived to visit Las Vegas. A celebration of this era has become known as Helldorado Days.

Although the suppression efforts resulted in declines at gambling venues and resulted in a business downturn, the city was recharged—both literally and figuratively—when the dam was completed in 1935. In 1937, Southern Nevada Power became the first utility to supply power from the dam, and Las Vegas was its first customer. Electricity flowed into Las Vegas and Fremont Street became known as Glitter Gulch due to the many bright lights powered by electricity from Hoover Dam.  Meanwhile, although the dam worker population disappeared, Hoover Dam and its reservoir Lake Mead turned into tourist attractions on their own and the need for additional higher-class hotels became clear.

In 1940, U.S. Route 95 was extended south into Las Vegas, giving the city two major access roads. Also in 1940, KENO, Las Vegas's first permanent radio station, began broadcasting replacing the niche occupied earlier by transient broadcasters.

1941–1945: War years

On January 25, 1941, the U.S. Army established a flexible gunnery school for the United States Army Air Corps in Las Vegas. Mayor John L. Russell signed over land to the U.S. Army Quartermaster Corps for this development. The gunnery school later would become Nellis Air Force Base. The U.S. Army was not pleased with the legal prostitution in Las Vegas, and in 1942, forced Las Vegas to outlaw the practice, putting Block 16, the local red light district, permanently out of business.

On April 3, 1941, hotel owner Thomas Hull opened the El Rancho Vegas. It was the first resort on what became the Las Vegas Strip. The hotel gained much of its fame from the gourmet buffet that it offered. On October 30, 1942, Texas cinema magnate R.E. Griffith rebuilt on the site of a nightclub called Pair-O-Dice, that first opened in 1930, and renamed it Hotel Last Frontier. A few more resorts were built on and around Fremont Street, but it was the next hotel on the Strip that publicly demonstrated the influence of organized crime on Las Vegas.

Although ethnic organized crime figures had been involved in some of the operations at the hotels, the Mafia bosses never owned or controlled the hotels and clubs that remained monopolized by hard-bitten local Las Vegas families unwilling to cede ground to the crime bosses and proved strong enough to push back. This changed in post-war Las Vegas when Jewish gangster Bugsy Siegel, with help from friend and fellow mob boss Meyer Lansky, poured money through locally owned banks for cover of legitimacy and built The Flamingo in 1946. Siegel modeled his enterprises on the long-running gambling empire in Galveston, Texas, which had pioneered the high-class casino concepts that became mainstays on the Strip.

1946–1955: Postwar boom

Casinos backers get funding 

The Flamingo initially lost money and Siegel died in a hail of gunfire in Beverly Hills, California, in summer 1947. Additionally, local police and Clark County Sheriff deputies were notorious for their heavy-handed tactics toward mobsters who "grew too big for their pants". However, many mobsters saw the potential that gambling offered in Las Vegas. After gambling was legalized, the Bank of Las Vegas, led by E. Parry Thomas, became the first bank to lend money to the casinos, which Thomas regarded as the most important businesses in Las Vegas. At the same time, Allen Dorfman, a close associate of longtime Teamsters Union President Jimmy Hoffa and a known associate of the Chicago Outfit, took over the Teamsters Central States Pension Fund, which began lending money to Las Vegas casino owners and developers. They provided funding to build the Sahara, the Sands, the Riviera, the Fremont, and finally the Tropicana.

Even with the general knowledge that some of the owners of these casino resorts had dubious backgrounds, by 1954, over 8 million people were visiting Las Vegas yearly pumping $200 million into casinos. Gambling was no longer the only attraction; the biggest stars of films and music like Frank Sinatra, Dean Martin, Andy Williams, Liberace, Bing Crosby, Carol Channing, and others performed in intimate settings. After coming to see these stars, the tourists would resume gambling, and then eat at the gourmet buffets that have become a staple of the casino industry.

On November 15, 1950, the United States Senate Special Committee to Investigate Crime in Interstate Commerce (known at the Kefauver Hearings) met in Las Vegas. It was the seventh of 14 hearings held by the commission. Moe Sedway, manager of the Flamingo Hotel and a friend of mobster Bugsy Siegel, Wilbur Clark representing the Desert Inn, and Nevada Lieutenant Governor Clifford Jones were all called to testify. The hearings established that Las Vegas interests were required to pay Siegel to get the race wire transmitting the results of horse and dog races, prizefight results and other sports action into their casinos.

The hearing concluded that money from organized crime incontrovertibly was tied to the Las Vegas casinos and was becoming the controlling interest in the city, earning the organized crime groups vast amounts of income, strengthening their influence in the country. This led to a proposal by the Senate to institute federal gambling control. Nevada's Senator Pat McCarran was instrumental in defeating the measure in committee.

Along with their connections in Hollywood and New York City, these interests in Las Vegas were able to use publicity provided by these media capitals to steer the rapid growth of tourism into Las Vegas, thereby dooming Galveston, Texas; Hot Springs, Arkansas; and other illegal gaming centers around the nation. Nevada's legal gaming as well as the paradoxical increased scrutiny by local and federal law enforcement in these other locales during the 1950s made their demise inevitable.

Atomic testing 

While the Strip was booming, the U.S. Atomic Energy Commission on January 27, 1951 detonated the first of over a hundred atmospheric explosions at the Nevada Test Site. Despite the dangers and risks of radiation exposure from the fallout, which were greatly underestimated at the time, Las Vegas advertised the explosions as another tourist attraction and offered Atomic Cocktails in the Sky Room restaurant at the Desert Inn that provided the highest view of the mushroom clouds. During this time, the Las Vegas Chamber of Commerce successfully pushed for Vegas to become nicknamed the Atomic City. Several Miss Atomic pageants were held to help display the city's modernity and to continue spinning messages on the nearby testing to tourists.

The influx of government employees for the Atomic Energy Commission and from the Mormon-controlled Bank of Las Vegas spearheaded by E. Parry Thomas during those years funded the growing boom in casinos. But Las Vegas was doing more than growing casinos. In 1948, McCarran Field was established for commercial air traffic. In 1957, the University of Nevada, Las Vegas was established, initially as a branch of the University of Nevada, Reno and becoming independent in 1969. In 1959, the Clark County Commission built the Las Vegas Convention Center, which became a vital part of the area's economy. Southwest Gas expanded into Las Vegas in 1954.

These atmospheric tests would continue until enactment of the Partial Test Ban Treaty in 1963 when the tests moved underground. The last test explosion was in 1992.

1956–1969: The beginning of modern Las Vegas

Howard Hughes

In 1966, Howard Hughes, the eccentric hero of the American aviation industry, and noted American entrepreneurial financier with vast connections to long established networks in the country, moved to Las Vegas. Initially staying in the Desert Inn, he refused to vacate his room and instead decided to purchase the entire hotel. Hughes extended his financial empire to include Las Vegas real estate, hotels and media outlets, spending an estimated $300 million and using his considerable powers to take over many of the well-known hotels, especially the venues connected with organized crime, and he quickly became one of the more powerful men in Las Vegas. He was instrumental in changing the image of Las Vegas from its Wild West roots toward a cosmopolitan city.

Hank Greenspun

The local newspaper Las Vegas Sun and its editor Hank Greenspun led a crusade in those days to expose all the criminal ties, activities, and government corruption in Las Vegas. His investigative reporting and editorials led to the exposure of Clark County Sheriff Glen Jones' ownership of a brothel and the resignation of Lieutenant Governor Clifford A. Jones as the state's national committeeman for the Democratic Party. Before his death in 1989, Hank Greenspun founded The Greenspun Corporation to manage his family's assets, and it remains a major influence in Las Vegas, with media holdings in print, television and the Internet; substantial real estate holdings; and ownership stakes in a number of casinos.

Local government

One problem for the City of Las Vegas was that the Strip did not reside in Las Vegas. Because of this, the city lost tax revenue. There was a push to annex the Strip by the City of Las Vegas, but The Syndicate used the Clark County Commissioners to pull a legal maneuver by organizing the Las Vegas Strip properties into an unincorporated township named Paradise. Under Nevada Law, an incorporated town, Las Vegas, cannot annex an unincorporated township. To this day, virtually all of the Strip remains outside the City of Las Vegas.

Desegregation

Much like in other American settled counties and towns throughout the United States, entertainment venues were segregated between black- and white-owned businesses. With almost all of the businesses owned and operated by whites, Black Americans were barred from entering the venues, which remained focused, regardless of their legitimacy or criminality, on entertaining a white-only clientele. As a result of property deeds, businesses owned by or mainly serving non-whites were confined to clubs on the "west side" of the tracks. This also was enforced in many of the work positions. Thus, African Americans (except those who provided the labor for low-paying menial positions or entertainment) and Hispanics were limited in employment occupations at the white-owned clubs. However, because of employment deals with black worker groups, many clubs favored black workers, and the Hispanic population actually decreased 90% from 2,275 to just 236 by the mid-1950s.

Organized crime-owned businesses saw an opportunity in not dividing their clientele by race, and despite property deeds and city and county codes barring such activities, made several attempts at desegregating their businesses in the hopes of putting out of operation the non-white owned clubs and expanding their own market share. An attempt was made at forming an all-integrated night-club modeled on the Harlem Clubs of New York City during the 1920s and 1930s, like those owned by German-Jewish gangster Dutch Schultz. On May 24, 1955, Jewish crime boss Will Max Schwartz, along with other investors, opened the Moulin Rouge. It was a very upscale and racially integrated casino that actually competed against the resorts on the Strip, especially the non-white owned strips on the west side. By the end of the year the casino closed as Schwartz and his partners had a falling out, but the seeds for racial integration were sown.

Many sources have credited Frank Sinatra and the Rat Pack as a significant driving force behind desegregation in the casinos. One famous story tells of Sinatra's refusal to perform at the Sands Hotel unless the hotel provided Sammy Davis Jr. with a room. The famed performing group made similar demands at other venues, forcing owners to amend their policies over time.

However, it took political action for racial desegregation to occur. In 1960, the NAACP threatened a protest of the city's casinos for their policies. A meeting among the NAACP, the mayor and local businessmen resulted in citywide casino desegregation, starting with the employees. Many whites were attritioned from positions and their jobs given to the black unions. Along with the rest of the country, Las Vegas experienced the struggle for civil rights. Activists like James B. McMillan, Grant Sawyer, Bob Bailey, and Charles Keller dragged Las Vegas to racial integration.

Aside from seeing no business advantage to excluding non-white customers from casinos and clubs, the organized crime groups were composed of people of ethnicities (Jewish and Italian) that faced discrimination from WASP America and thus could understand the plight of blacks. This was also a driving force behind the integration advocated by ethnic performers such as Sinatra and Martin.

Another big force for equality was Mayor Oran Gragson. Spurred into local politics by a vigilante ring of cops who repeatedly broke into his appliance store, he implemented infrastructure improvements for the minority neighborhoods in Las Vegas, backed the NAACP in its actions, and promoted black workers for jobs. He also championed the cause of the Paiute tribe that owned a small portion of Las Vegas. Gragson stopped the U.S. government from evicting the tribe and made infrastructure improvements for them. His work helped reverse the decrease of minority populations in Las Vegas.

Local legislation kept up with the national legislation, and integration was finally established. The only violence came as a result of school integration, with violent riots and fights occurring in Clark High School when black gangs and youths began attacking the whites. Integration sparked white flight from the school district from 1965 to 1971.

1970–1988: Explosive growth
On a percentage basis, Las Vegas and Clark County experienced incredibly high growth rates starting in the 1930s and lasting until the late 2000s recession. During that period, the population of the city more than doubled in most decades. The rate slowed down in the 1970s with the decrease of the white birth rate, but never dropped below 60% (1980–1990), and even accelerated after 1990 due to immigration. By 2000, Las Vegas was the largest city founded in the 20th century, and by 2006 it was the 28th largest city in the U.S., with a population of 552,000 in the city and nearly 1.8 million in Clark County. The explosive growth resulted in rapid development of commercial and residential areas throughout the Las Vegas Valley. The strong boom in the resort business led to many new condominium developments all along the Strip and downtown area. Also urban sprawl development of single-family homes continued across the valley, building the areas of Henderson, North Las Vegas, Centennial Hills, and Summerlin.  The rapid development and population growth both halted abruptly in the late 2000s recession.

During this period of time, American author and journalist Hunter S. Thompson wrote and published his seminal novel Fear and Loathing in Las Vegas, detailing the experience of his 1971 trip to the city.

On November 21, 1980, the MGM Grand Hotel and Casino suffered a devastating fire. A total of 85 people died and 785 were injured in what remains the worst disaster in Nevada history. The property eventually was sold and reopened as Bally's Las Vegas, and MGM moved south to Tropicana Avenue.

1989–2014: The megaresort era

The "Mafia/Rat Pack" Las Vegas of the mid-20th century came to a gradual end in the 1980s with the aging out of the World War II generation, the decline of organized crime elements, and the rise of baby boomer entrepreneurs who began a new chapter in the city's history, the so-called megaresort era. Las Vegas began to become a more commercialized, family-oriented place with large corporations coming to own the hotels, casinos, and nightclubs in place of Mafia bosses. The megaresort era kicked off in 1989 with the construction of The Mirage. Built by developer Steve Wynn, it was the first resort built with money from Wall Street, selling $630 million in junk bonds. Its 3,044 rooms, each with gold tinted windows, set a new standard for Vegas luxury and attracted tourists in droves, leading to additional financing and rapid growth on the Las Vegas Strip. More landmark hotels and other structures were razed to make way for ever-larger and more opulent resorts including:

 1990: Rio and Excalibur
 1993: MGM Grand, Treasure Island, and Luxor,
 1996: Stratosphere Tower and Monte Carlo
 1997: New York-New York
 1998: Bellagio
 1999: Mandalay Bay, Venetian, and Paris
 2000: Planet Hollywood (Formerly Aladdin)
 2001: Palms
 2005: Wynn (opened in April by Wynn Resorts Limited opened its new flagship, the constructed at a cost of US$2.7 billion.)

The Helldorado Days festival was resumed in 2005 for the City of Las Vegas' centennial celebration.

Since 2007: Downturn and recovery 
The home mortgage crisis (2007-2010) and the late 2000s recession affected Las Vegas' economic success. New home construction was stalled, and construction projects either were canceled, postponed, or continued with financial troubles. Some of these projects included the MGM Mirage property of CityCenter, Fontainebleau, Echelon, and The Plaza. The global financial situation also had a negative effect on gaming and tourism revenue, causing many of the companies to report net loss. By 2010, empty lots on the Strip were affecting the foot traffic of other casinos.

Nevertheless, new landmark hotels and resorts were still to arise, including:
 2007: Palazzo
 2008: Encore
 2009: CityCenter (chain of hotels including Mandarin Oriental/Waldorf-Astoria, Vdara, Aria and shopping Crystals)
 2010: The Cosmopolitan
 2014: The Linq
 2020: Circa Resort & Casino
 2021: Resorts World

In the 2010s, many analysts agreed that the Las Vegas economy is recovering, with improving conditions in tourism and the housing market for 2013. Prices are rising and there has been a large increase in the million dollar home market, with many new custom homes being built. January 2013 marked the 19th consecutive month with home sales higher than the same month in the previous year. In addition, Las Vegas was named America's Top Turn Around Market for 2012 by Trulia.

During the late evening of October 1, 2017, Las Vegas became the scene of the deadliest mass shooting committed by a single gunman in the history of the United States. A gunman opened fire on Route 91 Harvest festival-goers from the Mandalay Bay resort, killing 60 and injuring 867.

The Alpine Motel Apartments fire occurred in downtown Las Vegas in December 2019, killing six people. It is the deadliest fire to occur in city limits.

The COVID-19 pandemic reached the city in March 2020, having various effects such as business closures and time. This has also led to mass cancellation of events and festivals.

Due to concerns about climate change in the wake of a 2002 drought, daily water consumption in Las Vegas has been reduced from 314 gallons per resident in 2003 to around 205 gallons in 2015. Despite these conservation efforts, local water consumption remains 30 percent more than in Los Angeles, and over three times that of San Francisco. In June 2017, a heat wave grounded more than 40 airline flights of small aircraft, with American Airlines reducing sales on certain flights and Las Vegas tying its record high at 117 degrees Fahrenheit.

Overall, Las Vegas continues to evolve, with many places being constructed and built. The city also continued to open more retail, which are largely high end. Furthermore, it continues to attract and gain more tourists from around the world. Many recent buildings of 2020s decade include Area15, Circa, and Resorts World, all of which are unique to Las Vegas. It will continue the urban sprawl of Las Vegas and its county.
 
Las Vegas Strip will look different in 2020s since the brand new decade will bring new designs such as reshapes and these new LED lights on the edges of the Luxor and the debut of Mayfair Supper Club. The Las Vegas Convention Center completes its extension to the Strip with convention business being more bigger than other buildings, which will gets its own renovation in 2021 to 2024. Allegiant Stadium opened in 2020, which welcome new raiders and fans. Other new events include MSG Sphere rounding out the Vegas skyline, Flamingo Steakhouse's rebirth in the vintage style, mysterious Area15 opens its doors, complicated relationship with Asian dining, a lot of new residencies, Resorts World preparing a newer debut, Caesars Forum emerges as a new event space, Wynn getting a few recent restaurants, Hard Rock transforming into a Virgin Resort, new kind of food tour that hits The LINQ in the Strip, new burger and drive-in, and Truth & Tonic being the first all-vegan restaurant on the Strip of Las Vegas. It is suggested that the downtown will look different with the overhead of Vision video and $15 million renovation of its own with new roadwork in the Fremont East District. Also, Downtown Grand in Las Vegas is expanding widely with this establishment of a second hotel rise.

See also

 Timeline of Las Vegas
 Welcome to Fabulous Las Vegas sign

References

Sources 

 Las Vegas website
 Ainlay, Thomas, Jr., & Gabaldon, Judy Dixon. Las Vegas: The Fabulous First Century, Arcadia Publishing, 2003.
 Denton, Sally & Morris, Howard. The Money and the Power: The Making of Las Vegas and Its Hold on America – 1947–2000. Knopf, Borzoi Books, 2001.
 Land, Barbara & Land, Myrick. A Short History of Las Vegas. University of Nevada Press, Reno, 1999
 Paher, Stanley W. Las Vegas: As It Began – As It Grew, Nevada Publications, Las Vegas, NV, 1971.
 Orleck, Annelise. "Storming Caesar's Palace", 1971 demonstration and community organizing by Las Vegas welfare mothers

Further reading
 Bégout, Bruce. Zeropolis: the experience of Las Vegas (Reaktion Books, 2003).
 Bernhard, Bo J., Michael S. Green, and Anthony F. Lucas. "From maverick to mafia to MBA: Gaming industry leadership in Las Vegas from 1931 through 2007." Cornell Hospitality Quarterly 49.2 (2008): 177-190. online

 Brigham, Jay. "Reno, Las Vegas, and the Strip: A Tale of Three Cities." Western Historical Quarterly 46.4 (2015): 529–530.
 Bybee, Shannon. "History, development, and legislation of Las Vegas casino gaming." in Legalized Casino Gaming in the United States (Routledge, 2014) pp. 3-24.

 Chung, Su Kim. Las Vegas Then and Now,( Holt: Thunder Bay Press, 2012)
 Culver, Lawrence. "Sin City or Suburban Crucible? Searching for Meanings in the New Las Vegas"  Journal of Urban History 35.7 (2009): 1052-1058; historiography.

 Douglass, William A., and Pauliina Raento. "The tradition of invention: conceiving Las Vegas." Annals of Tourism Research 31.1 (2004): 7-23. online
 Foster, Jonathan. Stigma Cities: The Reputation and History of Birmingham, San Francisco, and Las Vegas (University of Oklahoma Press, 2018) online.
 Goodwin, Joanne L. "Mojave mirages: gender and performance in Las Vegas." Women's History Review 11.1 (2002): 115-132.

 Gragg, Larry D. Becoming America's Playground: Las Vegas in the 1950s (University of Oklahoma Press, 2019).
 Jones, Karen. "The Old West in Modern Splendor: Frontier folklore and the selling of Las Vegas." European Journal of American Culture 29.2 (2010): 93-110.

 Luke, Timothy W. "Gaming space: casinopolitan globalism from Las Vegas to Macau." in Global Ideologies and Urban Landscapes (Routledge, 2013) pp. 77-87.

 Moehring, Eugene P. Resort City in the Sunbelt: Las Vegas, 1930–2000 (2000).
 Moehring, Eugene P., and Michael S. Green. Las Vegas: A centennial history (University of Nevada Press, 2005).
  Moehring, Eugene, "The Urban Impact: Towns and Cities in Nevada's History," Nevada Historical Society Quarterly 57 (2014): 177–200. 
 Papa, Paul W. It Happened in Las Vegas: Remarkable Events that Shaped History (Rowman & Littlefield, 2009).

  Rowley, Rex J. Everyday Las Vegas: Local Life in a Tourist Town (2013)
 Scriven, Michael. "The philosophical foundations of Las Vegas." Journal of gambling studies 11.1 (1995): 61-75.
 Simich, Jerry L., and Thomas C. Wright, eds. The peoples of Las Vegas: One city, many faces (University of Nevada Press, 2005).

 Stierli, Martino. Las Vegas in the Rearview Mirror: The City in Theory, Photography, and Film, Los Angeles: Getty Publications, 2013), 

Thompson, Hunter S. Fear and loathing in Las Vegas: A savage journey to the heart of the American dream (Vintage, 1998) online.
 Venturi, Robert. Learning from Las Vegas: The Forgotten Symbolism of Architectural Form, Cambridge: MIT Press, 1972) 
 Weaver, David B. "Contemporary tourism heritage as heritage tourism: Evidence from Las Vegas and Gold Coast." Annals of tourism research 38.1 (2011): 249-267. compares to Australia.
 Zoglin, Richard. Elvis in Vegas: How the King Reinvented the Las Vegas Show (Simon & Schuster, 2020).
 Zook, Lynn M., Allen Sandquist, and Carey Burke. Las Vegas, 1905-1965 (Arcadia Publishing, 2009).

 
History of Nevada